Schistura dalatensis is a species of ray-finned fish in the stone loach genus Schistura. It is confined to the headwaters of the Dong Nai River in Lam Dong Province, southern Vietnam where it is found in streams with stony beds.

References 

D
Fish described in 2001
Taxa named by Jörg Freyhof